The Public Health (Alcohol) Act 2018 (Act No. 24 of 2018) is an Act of the Oireachtas.

It was first published in 2015 and agreed on by the Dáil in October 2018. It is intended to reduce alcohol consumption and the harms caused by the misuse of alcohol. It provides for statutory minimum prices on alcohol, restrictions on advertising, stark warning labels on alcohol products, and the separation and reduced visibility of alcohol products in mixed trading outlets.

The Minister for Health Simon Harris brought 23 sections of the Bill into operation in November 2018. Alcohol advertising is to be banned within 200 metres of a school, crèche, or local authority playground and in or on public service vehicles, at public transport stops or stations from 2019. From 2021 various measures come into force to ensure that children are protected from alcohol advertising.

References

2018 in Irish law
Acts of the Oireachtas of the 2010s
Retailing in Ireland
Alcohol in the Republic of Ireland
Price controls
Health law in Ireland
Regulation in Ireland